Zlatá Olešnice is a municipality and village in Jablonec nad Nisou District in the Liberec Region of the Czech Republic. It has about 500 inhabitants.

Administrative parts
Villages of Lhotka, Návarov and Stanový are administrative parts of Zlatá Olešnice.

Notable people
Antal Stašek (1843–1931), writer
František Šimůnek (1910–?), Nordic skier
Helena Wilsonová (1937–2019), photographer

References

Villages in Jablonec nad Nisou District